Eremicamura is a moth genus in the family Autostichidae. It contains the species Eremicamura mercuriata, which is found in the Russian Far East (Amur).

References

Symmocinae